John Stockwell Samuels IV is an American actor, director, producer, writer and former model. For writing the film Cheaters, he was nominated for the Primetime Emmy Award for Outstanding Writing for a Limited Series, Movie, or Dramatic Special.

Early life
Stockwell was born in Galveston, Texas, the son of Ellen Richards and John S. Samuels III, an attorney. Stockwell's sister is historian Evelyn Welch, and his niece is singer and songwriter Florence Welch. He attended Harvard University, and simultaneously began commuting to New York City to appear on episodes of the soap opera Guiding Light.

Career
Stockwell began his career as an international model. During his time as a model, he became a friend of Andy Warhol. His first feature film as an actor came with a small role in 1981's So Fine. His well-known roles came in the 1983 comedy film Losin' It as Spider; later that year, in the John Carpenter horror film Christine, as Dennis Guilder; and the 1985 comedy film My Science Project as Michael Harlan. Also in 1985 he appeared in the poorly received City Limits; though unsuccessful at the box office, it was later riffed in an episode of Mystery Science Theater 3000. In 1986, he appeared in Top Gun as Cougar. He made guest appearances on TV shows including The Young Riders and Friday the 13th: The Series.

Stockwell directed several films, including Cheaters (2000), Crazy/Beautiful (2001), Blue Crush (2002), Into the Blue (2005), Turistas (2006), Heart (2009), the Gina Carano star-vehicle In the Blood, and the 2016 Kickboxer reboot Kickboxer: Vengeance.

Stockwell also wrote the screenplay for the 2001 film Rock Star.

Personal life
Stockwell is married to Helene Henderson, a chef and caterer. They have three children.

Filmography

References

External links
 
 

Male actors from Texas
American male film actors
American male television actors
Living people
People from Galveston, Texas
Action film directors
20th-century American male actors
21st-century American male actors
Male models from Texas
American male screenwriters
Film directors from Texas
Screenwriters from Texas
Harvard University alumni
Year of birth missing (living people)